St Oswald's Church is in the village of Thornton in Lonsdale, North Yorkshire, England. It is an active Anglican parish church in the deanery of Ewecross, the archdeaconry of Craven and the Diocese of Leeds. Its benefice is united with that of All Saints, Burton in Lonsdale. The church is recorded in the National Heritage List for England as a designated Grade II* listed building.

History

The tower dates from the 15th century. In 1868–70 the church, other than the tower and three Norman arches, was rebuilt in Perpendicular style by the Lancaster architects Paley and Austin.  This cost £5,000 (equivalent to £ as of ), and was paid for from the will of Felix Slade, after whom the Slade School of Fine Art was named, and who had lived in a house nearby.  The church was damaged by a fire in February 1933, and was rebuilt in 1934–35 by Austin and Paley at a cost of about £9,000.

Architecture

The church is constructed in limestone rubble with sandstone dressings, and has Westmorland slate roofs. The plan consists of a four-bay nave, north and south aisles with chapels, a two-bay chancel, a south porch, and a west tower. The tower is in four stages with diagonal buttresses and an embattled parapet. It has a west doorway with a pointed arch, over which is a three-light window. Above this is small ogee-headed window. The bell openings have two lights. The tower is surmounted by a 19th-century pyramidal spire and a lead finial. The windows on the sides of the church have two or three lights, and the east window has four lights with trefoil heads. Inside the church, some of the arcades have pointed arches, while others are in Norman style. The earliest memorials in the church are to the Redmayne family, dating from 1678.

See also

List of ecclesiastical works by Paley and Austin

References

Bibliography

English Gothic architecture in North Yorkshire
Gothic Revival architecture in North Yorkshire
Church of England church buildings in North Yorkshire
Grade II* listed churches in North Yorkshire
Anglican Diocese of Leeds
Paley and Austin buildings
English churches with Norman architecture